Halka Nasha is a popular Hindi ghazal album of the Indian singer and Ghazal composer Hariharan. It was released on 1996 by Bayshore, and later re-released by the same label in 2004 for its popularity. The album consists of 8 songs composed by Utpal Biswas and sung by Hariharan. Hariharan's 3-year-old son Karan Hariharan faced the camera with him for popular track ‘Halka Nasha’ along with Dr Tinku Bali. The album was also simultaneously released in Punjabi of the same name and in Tamil of Kadhal Vedham.

Track listing
All music composed by Utpal Biswas

Album credits
 Utpal Biswas - composer
 Hariharan - singer
Recorded,Mixed and Mastered- Shantanu Mukherjee
Arranged by-Bhavdeep Jaipurwale

References

Hariharan (singer) albums
1996 albums
Hindi-language albums